Mark Fisher (better known as k-punk; 1968–2017) was a writer, cultural theorist, and blogger.

Mark Fisher may also refer to:
 Mark Fisher (architect) (1947–2013), entertainment architect
 Mark Fisher (musician) (1959–2016), musician
 Mark Fisher (politician) (born 1944), British politician
 Mark Fisher (songwriter) (1895–1948), American songwriter
 Mark N. Fisher (born 1962), member of the Maryland House of Delegates
 Mark Fisher, murder victim; see John Giuca#Murder of Mark Fisher

See also
 Marc Fisher (born 1958), American journalist
 Mark Fischer (disambiguation)
 Mark Fisher Fitness, boutique gymnasium
 Fisher (surname)